Gongylus or Gongylos may refer to:

 Gongylus of Eretria, the agent by whom the Spartan general Pausanias communicated with Xerxes I of Persia in 477 BCE
 Gongylus of Corinth, a captain who reinforced Syracuse in 414 BCE at a crucial point of the Sicilian Expedition
 Gongylus, a genus of praying mantises in the family Empusidae
 Gongylus, a genus of skinks in the family Scincidae

See also 
 Gongylodes